Rope incense or Tibetan incense is made in Tibet, Northern parts of Nepal, and Bhutan. Incense is an important representation of the Tibetan culture. These incenses have a characteristic "earthy" or herbal scent to them. Rope incenses can contain 30 or more ingredients. As with most Asian incense, Tibetan incense is not rolled around a bamboo stick, but is extruded into lengths or coils. The incense is known as bateko dhoop (lit. braided incense) in Nepali language and is used as an alternative to stick incense.

Medicine 

In Tibetan medicine, incense is regarded as a way of treatment for various ailments. This information can be found in Tibetan medical books which originated from the four Tantras (Root Tantra, Tantra of Enlightenment, Tantra of Instructions, Concluding Tantra) which is also known as rGyudbzhi in Tibetan. It is the central work upon which contemporary Tibetan medicine is based. Tibetan medical theory states that everything in the universe is made up of the 5 proto-elements: sa (earth), chu (water), me (fire), rLung (wind or air), and Nam-mkha (space). But only four play a role in the classification of our illnesses, except Nam-mkha. Each element contains eight active forces and 17 qualities. Some of these elements are contained in our three bodily energies and their imbalance affects the equilibrium of the three 'fluids' (rLung, mkhrispa and badkan).

Production 

Authentic Tibetan incense originates either from traditional monastery or medical college/hospital formulation, so Tibetan incense follows a particular lineage which can be traced back to the originator. Over the years, Tibetan incense making have been polluted and over commercialized which leads to incense formulation by non-authentic makers. This has affected and degenerated the Tibetan incense formulation and making methods to a certain degree, which forms an important part of the unique Tibetan Culture. 

But there are still some in parts of Nepal and Bhutan that produce Tibetan incense in an authentic manner, by using authentic Himalayan herbs and ingredients.

References 

Incense by region
Incense
Tibetan culture
Nepalese culture